The Maya skate (Leucoraja caribbaea) is a species of skate in the family Rajidae. It is found in the western Atlantic Ocean off the coast of Mexico at a depths near 457 metres.

References
 

Leucoraja
Fish described in 1977